Tennis were contested at the 2002 Asian Games in Busan, South Korea from October 2 to October 12, 2002. Tennis had team, doubles, and singles events for men and women, as well as a mixed doubles competition. The tennis competition was held at the Geumjeong Tennis Stadium.

The host nation South Korea finished first in the medal table with seven medals.

Schedule

Medalists

Medal table

Participating nations
A total of 102 athletes from 19 nations competed in tennis at the 2002 Asian Games:

See also
 Tennis at the Asian Games

References

 Official website
 Results Book Pages 735–742

 
2002
Asian Games
2002 Asian Games events
2002 Asian Games